Anthemis urvilleana is a plant species in the Asteraceae family.

References

Endemic flora of Malta
urvilleana
Taxa named by Augustin Pyramus de Candolle
Flora of Malta